Groupe Mabrouk (مجموعة المبروك) is a Tunisian retail company. It operates SNMVT Monoprix and Géant stores, under license from Groupe Casino. It is one of three major supermarket operators in Tunisia. In 2007 it had a 38% marketshare in Tunisia.

References

Retail companies of Tunisia